Katharina Pepijn or Catharina Pepijn (baptized on 13 February 1619, Antwerp - 12 November 1688, Antwerp) was a Flemish painter who was known for her history paintings and portraits.

Life

Very little is known about the life and training of Katharina Pepijn. She was the daughter of Marten Pepijn and Marie Huybrechts. She likely trained with her father, a prominent painter in Antwerp. In 1654 she became a member of the Antwerp Guild of St. Luke as a 'wijnmeester', i.e. the daughter of a master.

Very little is known about her career.  At the end of her life she was renting a house in a beguinage.  She was taken ill and was cared for by a nurse.  After she died she was buried at Antwerp Cathedral.

Work
Katharina Pepijn was known in her time as a history and portrait painter.

Currently only two works are attributed to Katharina Pepijn. Both are portraits of abbots of St. Michael's Abbey, Antwerp, executed with oil on canvas in the 1650s. That of Abbot Johannes Chrysostomus vander Sterre was made shortly after his death in 1652. The other is of Abbot Norbertus van Couwerven. Both paintings were originally kept at St. Michael's Abbey. Her portraits are in the style of Rubens and van Dyck.

Notes

External links

Flemish Baroque painters
Flemish portrait painters
Flemish history painters
Flemish women painters
Painters from Antwerp
17th-century Flemish painters
17th-century women artists
1610s births
1688 deaths